The Government of Latvia is the central government of the Republic of Latvia. The Constitution of Latvia outlines the nation as a parliamentary republic 

represented by a unicameral parliament (Saeima) and the Cabinet of Ministers of the Republic of Latvia, which form the executive branch of the Government of Latvia.

Since the early 2000s cabinet meetings in Latvia have been open to the public. In June 2013, the Latvian government became one of the first in Europe to offer live internet broadcasts of cabinet meetings.

Current Cabinet of Ministers 
The incumbent cabinet is the Kariņš cabinet since 23 January 2019.

List of governments

References 

 The Cabinet of Ministers of the Republic of Latvia website

 
Politics of Latvia
European governments

he:פוליטיקה של לטביה#ממשלת לטביה